Hyde  was a county constituency represented in the House of Commons of the Parliament of the United Kingdom from 1885 until 1918. It was seated in the town of Hyde, Cheshire.

From the 1918 general election onwards, the town has been represented in parliament through the constituency of Stalybridge and Hyde.

Boundaries 
The constituency, officially Cheshire, Hyde Division, was created from the two-member Eastern division of Cheshire by the Redistribution of Seats Act 1885 as one of eight new single-member divisions of Cheshire. It consisted of the following parishes and townships in north east Cheshire:
Bredbury, the part of Brinnington outside the Municipal Borough of Stockport, Godley
, Hattersley, Hollingworth, Hyde, Marple, Mottram, Newton, Offerton, Romiley, Tintwistle, Torkington and Werneth.

Abolition
The Representation of the People Act 1918 reorganised constituencies throughout Great Britain. The bulk of the Hyde constituency was merged with parliamentary borough of Stalybridge to form the new seat of Stalybridge and Hyde. The Bredbury, Marple and Romiley areas passed to an expanded Macclesfield constituency, while Offerton and Torkington, which now formed part of the urban district of Hazel Grove and Bramhall, were included in Knutsford.

Members of Parliament

Elections

Elections in the 1880s

Elections in the 1890s

Elections in the 1900s

Elections in the 1910s

General Election 1914–15:

Another General Election was required to take place before the end of 1915. The political parties had been making preparations for an election to take place and by the July 1914, the following candidates had been selected; 
Liberal: Francis Neilson
Unionist: James Leadbitter Knott

nominee of the National Union of Attested Married Men, an organisation opposed to the government's policy on conscription.

See also

 History of parliamentary constituencies and boundaries in Cheshire

References

Sources

Parliamentary constituencies in North West England (historic)
Constituencies of the Parliament of the United Kingdom established in 1885
Constituencies of the Parliament of the United Kingdom disestablished in 1918
Hyde, Greater Manchester